(Rheingau chorale), now , is a mixed choir of the  region in Germany, performing mostly sacred music in services and concerts.

Frank Stähle 

The purpose of the choir was to sing in church services of the region and to sing oratorios in concert. The groups rehearsed separately in Geisenheim and performed the concerts together.

In 1979, Bach's St Matthew Passion was performed in St. Bonifatius, Wiesbaden and in Worms, in a collaboration with the Wormser Kurrende. Erich Wenk sang the title part, Klesie Kelly the soprano parts.

In 1980, the Geisenheim group performed Buxtehude's  in Geisenheim.

A concert on 13 June 1981 combined Palestrina's , performed by selected voices under assistant conductor Horst Werner, and Bruckner's Mass No. 2 in E minor for eight-part choir and brass.

Horst Werner 

He first conducted Haydn's Harmoniemesse and Bach's cantata Wachet! betet! betet! wachet! BWV 70, with Christoph Prégardien as a soloist. In a second concert, the group sang Schubert's Mass No. 6 in e-flat major.

In 1985, the choir performed Karol Szymanowski's  and Leoš Janáček' Glagolitic Mass with organist Elisabeth Maranca and the Südwestfälische Philharmonie (de).

Hampel noted in a review that Werner, also a musicologist, supplied solid historic background for the second version in the program notes and a preceding lecture, and that he managed to fill the turba choruses with energy, in diction and even more in dramatic expression.

Tassilo Schlenther | Neue Rheingauer Kantorei 

A new choir, building on the tradition, was founded by Tassilo Schlenther in 2002, again expanding the choir of the Geisenheim protestantic parish.

The group, not yet under the name, collaborated with the choirs of St. Martin, Idstein, performing in 1996 Rutter's Magnificat, in 1999 Puccini's  and in 2001 Rutter's Requiem and Britten's The Company of Heaven for speakers, soloists, chorus and orchestra, all performed both in Idstein and Johannisberg. In 2009, the Neue Rheingauer Kantorei performed Haydn's Die Schöpfung with soloists Elisabeth Scholl, Daniel Sans and Andreas Pruys. Services included an Easter vigil in Eberbach Abbey in 2013. The choir participated in a television portrait of the ARD about the Rheingau region by Günter Wewel. A concert in 2014, performed in the Geisenheim Protestant church, was dedicated to contemporary Scandinavian music including works by Ola Gjeilo and Knut Nystedt. 2014 also saw a remarkable performance of Verdi's Requiem. A reviewer noted the choir's flexibility to sing different styles of music.

References

External links 
 Frank Stähle Dr. Hoch's Konservatorium 
 Horst Werner corodelcastello.de 
 Neue Rheingauer Kantorei Official website 

Culture in Wiesbaden
German choirs
Musical groups established in 1977
Musical groups established in 2002